Center Township is one of twelve townships in Delaware County, Indiana. According to the 2010 census, its population was 69,199 and it contained 31,368 housing units.

Geography
Burlington Lake and Phillips Lake are in this township.

Cities and towns
 Muncie (vast majority)

Unincorporated towns
 Andersonville
 Aultshire
 Creston
 Drew
 Irvington
 Liberty Corners
 Mayfield
 Middletown Park
 Morningside
(This list is based on USGS data and may include former settlements.)

Adjacent townships
 Hamilton Township (north)
 Delaware Township (northeast)
 Liberty Township (east)
 Perry Township (southeast)
 Monroe Township (south)
 Salem Township (southwest)
 Mount Pleasant Township (west)
 Harrison Township (northwest)

Major highways
  U.S. Route 35
  Indiana State Road 3
  Indiana State Road 32
  Indiana State Road 332

Cemeteries
 Beech Grove Cemetery, 1400 W Kilgore Ave, Muncie, IN 47305. South bank of the White River. Earliest burial 1841. Over 100 acres. As the only significant burial ground in Muncie for more than a century, Beech Grove Cemetery is a rich source of information for local historians and genealogists. 
 Carmichael Cemetery, 200 E. 6th St., Muncie, IN. Earliest burial 1848. 46 Stones.
 Collins Cemetery, Intersection of Harvey and Ethel Ave., Muncie, IN. Earliest burial 1833.
 Tomlinson Cemetery, 5301 S Old State Rd 67, Muncie, IN 47302
 Elm Ridge Memorial Park, 4600 W Kilgore Ave, Muncie, IN 47304. Earliest burial 1927. Link to website.
 Parker-Moore Graveyard, East Memorial Dr., Muncie, IN. Earliest burial 1835. 139 stones.

Demographics

2020 census
As of the census of 2020,  there were 64,549 people, 26,201 households, and 8,389 families living in the township. The racial makeup of the township was 78.1% White, 11.6% African American, 1.3% Asian, 0.3% Native American or Alaskan Native, 0.1% Native Hawaiian or Pacific Islander, 2.1% from other races, and 6.5% from two or more races. Hispanic or Latino of any race were 4.2% of the population.

There were 26,201 households, of which 16.2% had children under the age of 18 living with them, 29.6% were married couples living together, 35.5% had a female householder with no husband present,  26.1% had a male householder with no wife present, and 8.8% were non-families. 61.6% of all households were made up of individuals. The average household size was 2.46 and the average family size was 2.83.

49.6% of the population had never been married. 29.8% of residents were married and not separated, 5.6% were widowed, 13.5% were divorced, and 1.5% were separated.

The median age in the township was 28.9. 4.4% of residents were under the age of 5; 16.2% of residents were under the age of 18; 83.8% were age 18 or older; and 13.8% were age 65 or older. 5.9% of the population were veterans.

The most common language spoken at home was English with 95.7% speaking it at home, 1.7% spoke Spanish at home, 1.4% spoke and Asian or Pacific Islander language, 1.1% spoke another Indo-European language at home, and 0.1% spoke some other language. 2.5% of the population were foreign born.

The median household income in Center Township was $33,928, 39.6% lower than the median average for the state of Indiana. 30.4% of the population were in poverty, including 32.2% of residents under the age of 18.

References
 
 United States Census Bureau cartographic boundary files

External links
 Indiana Township Association
 United Township Association of Indiana

Townships in Delaware County, Indiana
Townships in Indiana